The Battle of Ba Gia was a major battle that marked the beginning of the Viet Cong's (VC) Summer Offensive of 1965, during the early phases of the Vietnam War. The battle took place in Quảng Ngãi Province, South Vietnam, between May 28–31, 1965.

Following the victory of VC forces in the Battle of Bình Giã earlier in the year, the North Vietnamese leadership in Hanoi decided to intensify their war effort in order to defeat the American-backed Government of South Vietnam. The North Vietnamese war effort received a major boost in the first half of 1965, when the Soviet Union and the People's Republic of China stepped up the delivery of military aid, which included the deployment of military specialists and other personnel to train North Vietnam's armed forces. The North Vietnamese decision to intensify the war culminated in the Summer Offensive of 1965, which aimed to destroy the regular divisions of the Army of the Republic of Vietnam (ARVN) in large-scale battles, and pin down the elite units of the ARVN strategic reserve. In Quảng Ngãi Province, South Vietnam, the VC kick-started their summer campaign by attacking elements of the ARVN 51st Infantry Regiment during the early hours of May 29, 1965. In the days that followed, the VC destroyed an entire ARVN Task Force to mark a successful start to their summer campaign.

Background
During the first half of 1965, the war in South Vietnam sharply escalated. In January 1965, while on a visit to China, a North Vietnamese military delegation met with Chinese Prime Minister Zhou Enlai to discuss the situation. In the meeting the North Vietnamese were advised by Zhou Enlai to step up military operations in South Vietnam, in order to destroy the ARVN whenever they came out to fight. In March, in response to the VC's appeal for support from socialist troops, Leonid Brezhnev announced that Soviet citizens were volunteering to fight on the side of North Vietnam and the VC. However, Hanoi privately informed Moscow that the VC only wanted to gain international support, and they did not need actual volunteers.

In April, the Soviet Union's political support for North Vietnam materialised with the delivery of MiG fighter planes and SA-2 anti-aircraft missiles, along with large quantities of food and ammunition. In addition, Soviet pilots and other specialists were dispatched to North Vietnam to train North Vietnamese military personnel in the use of advanced military hardware. China, not to be outdone by its Soviet rival, increased the delivery of armaments to North Vietnam at rates which surpassed their commitments in 1964. China also offered logistical assistance to the North Vietnamese military by providing seven divisions of Chinese soldiers for road construction and other projects. The logistical support offered by China had a significant impact on the North Vietnamese military, as North Vietnam needed all its combat divisions to conduct operations, to aide the Pathet Lao in Laos and the VC in South Vietnam.

Buoyed by the recent victory in the Battle of Bình Giã and the support of their major allies, North Vietnamese leaders began preparing a strategy to defeat South Vietnamese and United States military forces. Lê Duẩn, Secretary of the Communist Party, believed that the South Vietnamese regime was able to survive because they still had a strong army to rely upon. Therefore, to win the war and reunite the country, the South Vietnamese military had to be destroyed completely. Lê Duẩn believed the Communist forces must destroy three or four of South Vietnam's nine regular army divisions in a series of large battles, and pin down the eleven elite battalions of the South Vietnamese strategic reserve. Thus, North Vietnamese leaders decided to launch a summer offensive with the objective of defeating the ARVN by drawing them into battle repeatedly with numerous, geographically dispersed attacks.

Prelude
At the beginning of the summer season in 1965, VC Commanders in  Military Region 5 passed a resolution to launch a military operation known as the "Lê Độ Campaign", which was supposed to last from May 15 to August 30, 1965. The operation was aimed at ARVN military units based in the provinces of Gia Lai, Kon Tum and Quảng Ngãi. Preparations for a major military offensive was  made at the beginning of 1965 when , Chairman of the VC Rear Services in Military Region 5, began the process of transporting soldiers and materiel into the VC areas of operation. , Deputy Chief of the VC Chief of Staff in Military Region 5, was responsible for conducting reconnaissance missions and air defence. PAVN Major General Chu Huy Mân was sent to South Vietnam to take command of military operations.

Prior to the Summer Offensive of 1965, Quảng Ngãi and the surrounding provinces had witnessed a substantial increase in VC military activities. On February 6, 1965, the VC 409th Sapper Battalion attacked the U.S. base at Camp Holloway at Pleiku, injuring more than a hundred American personnel and damaging about 20 aircraft. The U.S. retaliated by launching Operation Flaming Dart, bombing selected targets in North Vietnam. On 10 February the VC bombed a U.S. military billet in Qui Nhơn and the U.S. retaliated by launching Operation Flaming Dart II. Following those actions the VC decided to launch a major assault on South Vietnamese units in Ba Gia, a small village in Sơn Tịnh District about 10 kilometres away from Quảng Ngãi town.

In May 1965, the VC 1st Regiment (part of the Viet Cong 2nd Division) moved into northern Quảng Ngãi from the neighbouring province of Quảng Nam. The VC 1st Regiment had three battalions (the 40th, 60th and 90th Battalions), and was placed under the command of Lê Hữu Trữ. In northern Quảng Ngãi, the 1st Regiment joined the 45th Independent Battalion and the 48th Local Force Battalion. In southern Quảng Ngãi, it joined the 83rd Local Force Battalion.: p. 9-13 On the other side, South Vietnamese military units in Quảng Ngãi Province formed part of the ARVN 1st Brigade, I Corps, commanded by Major General Nguyễn Chánh Thi. In Quảng Ngãi the main ARVN force included the 51st Infantry Regiment (part of the 25th Infantry Division), 3rd Marine Battalions, the 37th and 39th Ranger Battalion, and two artillery battalions equipped with 105mm artillery guns.

Battle
On the night of May 28, 1965, the VC marched into their designated positions around Ba Gia; the 90th Battalion took up their position at Minh Thành, the 60th Battalion at Vĩnh Lộc, the 40th Battalion at Duyên Phước, and the 45th Battalion at Vĩnh Khánh. The 1st Regimental Headquarters set up camp at Mount Hốc Khoai: p. 17, while the 83rd Local Force Battalion was ordered to encircle the administrative centre at Nghĩa Hành. At 5.45 am on May 29, elements of the VC 1st Regiment launched a surprise attack on Lộc Thọ, a small village located south of Ba Gia.: p. 20 Within 10 minutes of fighting, the two platoons of South Vietnamese Regional Force defending Lộc Thọ were subdued, and the VC quickly consolidated the battlefield around the area. At around 6:00 am ARVN Captain Nguyễn Văn Ngọc, commander of the 1st Battalion, 51st Infantry Regiment, led his unit from Gò Cao south toward Phước Lộc to stage a counter-attack against the lead element of the enemies' 1st Regiment.

At 9.50 am, as the ARVN 1st Battalion marched through Lộc Thọ village they were encircled by the VC 90th Battalion, who had set up ambush positions in Mount Khỉ and were waiting for the ARVN to arrive.: p. 21 Caught by surprise, the ARVN 1st Battalion descended into chaos and was unable to mount an effective counter-attack. In less than one hour of fighting, the battalion was completely destroyed with 270 soldiers either killed or wounded. Captain Nguyễn Văn Ngọc was amongst the 217 men who were captured. Only 65 ARVN soldiers and three American advisors managed to return to government lines. The VC also claimed to have destroyed one 105mm artillery piece, four GMC trucks and one Jeep. Meanwhile, the VC 83rd Local Force Battalion marched from Trà Khúc River toward Nghĩa Hành District, and began applying pressure on the ARVN stationed there. Thus, the VC were asserting control over Ba Gia and the surrounding areas.

On the afternoon of May 29, ARVN Major General Nguyễn Chánh Thi, commander of South Vietnam's I Corps Tactical Zone, responded to the VC assault by forming a Task Force with the objective of recapturing Ba Gia. The Task Force consisted of the 2nd Battalion, 51st Infantry Regiment, the 3rd Marine Battalion, the 39th Ranger Battalion and one squadron of M113 armored personnel carriers. According to Major General Nguyễn Chánh Thi's plan, the Task Force would achieve the following objectives: the 3rd Marine Battalion would advance along Route 5 toward the objective of Ba Gia; the 39th Ranger Battalion through An Thuyết, Vĩnh Lộc and Vĩnh Khánh and then capture Mount Chóp Nón; and the 2nd Battalion, 51st Infantry Regiment towards Phước Lộc and capture Mount Mả Tổ. On the morning of May 30 the South Vietnamese Task Force assembled in Quảng Ngãi town and waited for further orders, while ARVN artillery and U.S. Air Force fighter-bombers pounded VC positions around Ba Gia.

At around 12 noon on May 30, with extensive air support from U.S. fighter-bombers and UH-1 helicopter gunships, the ARVN advanced towards their objectives in two separate columns. In the first, the ARVN 39th Ranger Battalion approached northern Phước Lộc to secure Mount Chóp Nón, from where they could strike at the VC's southern flank. In the second column the ARVN 2nd Battalion and the 3rd Marine Battalion advanced towards their objectives of Mount Mả Tổ and Ba Gia respectively. However, South Vietnamese manoeuvres on the ground did not go unnoticed, because VC reconnaissance teams on Mount Khỉ had spotted the columns and responded accordingly. Elements of the VC 45th Battalion were ordered to set up ambush positions inside the village of Vĩnh Khánh, while the 60th Battalion was redeployed to Mount Mả Tổ and waited for the enemy there. At about 1 pm the ARVN 2nd Battalion, 51st Infantry Regiment arrived on Hill 47 in the vicinity of Mount Mả Tổ, but the VC 60th Battalion allowed them to advance toward their objective.

Meanwhile, the ARVN 39th Ranger Battalion secured their objective on Mount Chóp Nón, with the main formation of the VC 45th Battalion lining their troops on the rear positions of the ARVN Rangers. At 2:05 pm, the VC unleashed their ambush on the ARVN 2nd Battalion, forcing the ARVN infantrymen to fight for their lives. As fighting erupted on Mount Mả Tổ, the ARVN 3rd Marine Battalion inside the village of Phước Lộc was ordered to relieve the 2nd Battalion. However, by 3:30 pm the 3rd Marine Battalion was also surrounded by the VC 60th Battalion on Hill 47, which had moved out from Vĩnh Lộc village to engage the Marines. At the same time, VC mortar fire began slamming into South Vietnamese positions in the village of Phước Lộc, and fighting continued until 5 pm. When it concluded that evening both sides had suffered heavy casualties and the South Vietnamese 2nd Battalion and the 3rd Marine Battalion were forced to retreat back to Phước Lộc with four M-113 APCs providing fire support.

During the night of May 30, VC formations on the battlefield were ordered to wipe out what was left of the South Vietnamese Task Force in Phước Lộc village, as local villagers in Ba Gia helped the VC round up South Vietnamese prisoners. On Mount Chóp Nón, the VC 45th Battalion were able to advance within 100 metres of the ARVN 39th Ranger Battalion's line of defence without being noticed. In the early hours of May 31, the VC 40th Battalion resumed its attack on South Vietnamese positions in Phước Lộc, but the ARVN 2nd Battalion and 3rd Marine Battalion put up stiff resistance. After several hours of fierce fighting, the VC recaptured Phước Lộc where they found the bodies of 94 dead South Vietnamese soldiers. At the same time, the VC 45th Battalion attacked the ARVN 39th Ranger Battalion on Mount Chóp Nón. The VC bombarded the South Vietnamese with heavy mortars, which were followed by infantry assaults. By 4 am the VC 45th Battalion had successfully recaptured their final objective of Mount Chóp Nón, leaving the 39th Ranger Battalion decimated with 108 soldiers killed.

Aftermath
The battle at Ba Gia, which marked the beginning of the VC's Summer Offensive of 1965, had dealt a severe blow to South Vietnam's armed forces. For the first time in the VC's history, their forces at Ba Gia successfully decimated a regimental-sized ARVN Task Force in battle. According to Vietnam's official account of the battle, the VC killed or wounded 915 South Vietnamese soldiers, and 270 others were captured. In addition to the human casualties, the VC also captured 370 weapons of various kinds and destroyed 14 GMC trucks. South Vietnam, on the other hand, claimed to have killed 556 enemy soldiers, but only captured 20 weapons. Following their military victory, the VC Quảng Ngãi Province Provincial Committee initiated a political campaign to exercise political influence over the province. By June 3, 1965, the VC virtually controlled five districts in northern Quảng Ngãi Province (Bình Sơn, Sơn Tịnh, Nghĩa Hành, Tư Nghĩa and Mộ Đức), home to 10,000 civilians.

Even though the fighting at Ba Gia was minor in scale, it convinced President Lyndon B. Johnson that South Vietnam's armed forces could not deal with the growing Communist forces by themselves. On July 20, 1965, U.S. Secretary of Defence Robert McNamara laid out three options before Johnson concerning the American involvement in Vietnam: 1) withdraw all American personnel from Vietnam to minimise their losses; 2) continue American commitments at their then approximate level of about 75,000 men; 3) substantially expand the American military presence in Vietnam. Ultimately, President Johnson chose the third option and decided to 'Americanise' the Vietnam War, and by July 22 the U.S. military was authorised to raise its combat strength in Vietnam to 44 battalions. Thus, total U.S. military presence in Vietnam grew from 75,000 to 125,000 men, drawn mainly from the U.S. Army and the U.S. Marine Corps. Undeterred by this growing  U.S. military strength, North Vietnamese leaders decided to match American commitments by increasing the number of their troops in South Vietnam, thereby escalating the war.

Legacy

In May 2000, the Veterans Affairs Committee of Ba Gia regiment coordinated with the Veterans Association of Quảng Ngãi province to release the memoir "Ba Gia Victory - recall and reflect".

Notes

Bibliography
Ang Cheng Guan. (2002). The Vietnam War from the other side: The Vietnamese Communists' Perspective. London: Routledge. 
Anonymous. (1988). The Great Anti-U.S. War of Resistance for National Salvation: Military Events. Hanoi: People's Army Publishing House.
Comrade T.N. (1965). A Diary on the Battle of Ba Gia. Saigon-Gia Dinh: Office of Information, Culture and Education.
Mark Moyar. (2006). Triumph Forsaken: The Vietnam War 1954–1975. New York: Cambridge University Press. 
Nguyen Huy Toan & Pham Quang Dinh. (1990). History of the 304th Division: March–December 1965 (2nd edn). Hanoi: People's Army Publishing House.
Nguyen Dinh Uoc & Nguyen Van Minh. (1997). History of the War of Resistance Against America (3rd edn). Hanoi: National Politics Publishing.
Spencer Tucker. (1999). Warfare and History: Vietnam. Abingdon: Routledge.

Conflicts in 1965
1965 in Vietnam
Battles involving Vietnam
Battles of the Vietnam War involving the United States
Battles and operations of the Vietnam War in 1965
May 1965 events in Asia
History of Quảng Ngãi province